Frank Wheaton (October 15, 1876 – October 29, 1965) was an American tennis player. He competed in the men's singles and doubles events at the 1904 Summer Olympics.

References

External links
 

1876 births
1965 deaths
American male tennis players
Olympic tennis players of the United States
Tennis players at the 1904 Summer Olympics
People from Putnam, Connecticut
Sportspeople from Windham County, Connecticut
Tennis people from Connecticut